The name larch bolete is used to describe a number of fungi in the order Boletales which occur in association with species of larch, conifers in the genus Larix.  These fungi include:

members of the genus Suillus:
S. cavipes
S. grevillei (larch bolete, Greville's bolete, or bovine bolete)
S. ochraceoroseus (rosy larch bolete)
S. viscidus (sticky bolete, grayish larch bolete)

Boletales